Jonathan Uyloan (born November 26, 1983) is a Filipino-American professional basketball player who currently plays for the Nueva Ecija Rice Vanguards of the Maharlika Pilipinas Basketball League (MPBL). He was undrafted and signed by the Rain or Shine Elasto Painters in 2009.

PBA career statistics

Correct as of October 19, 2016

Season-by-season averages

|-
| align=left | 
| align=left | Rain or Shine
| 9 || 5.1 || .105 || .125 || .000 || 1.0 || .8 || .0 || .1 || .5
|-
| align=left | 
| align=left | Rain or Shine
| 8 || 5.0 || .533 || .375 || 1.000 || .8 || 1.3 || .5 || .0 || 2.6
|-
| align=left | 
| align=left | Rain or Shine
| 16 || 8.8 || .410 || .375 || .579 || 1.6 || .8 || .6 || .2 || 3.1
|-
| align=left | 
| align=left | Rain or Shine
| 21 || 9.4 || .443 || .375 || .538 || 1.5 || 1.2 || 1.3 || .3 || 3.3
|-
| align=left | 
| align=left | Rain or Shine
| 52 || 17.8 || .371 || .323 || .652 || 2.2 || 2.1 || 1.1 || .2 || 5.1
|-
| align=left | 
| align=left | GlobalPort / Meralco
| 41 || 12.3 || .329 || .354 || .500 || 1.2 || 1.0 || .7 || .2 || 3.4
|-class=sortbottom
| align=center colspan=2 | Career
| 147 || 12.6 || .366 || .336 || .600 || 1.6 || 1.4 || .9 || .2 || 3.7

References

1983 births
Living people
Filipino people of American descent
Filipino men's basketball players
NorthPort Batang Pier players
Meralco Bolts players
NLEX Road Warriors players
Point guards
Rain or Shine Elasto Painters players
Shooting guards
American men's basketball players
Golden West College alumni
Junior college men's basketball players in the United States